Allen Ifechukwu Onyema  CON (born 1964) is a Nigerian lawyer and entrepreneur. He is the chief executive officer of Air Peace, which he established in 2013.

Early life 
He was born in March 1964 in Benin City to Michael and Helen Onyema as the first of nine children. He hails from Anambra State, Nigeria.

Education 
Allen studied law at the University of Ibadan and graduated in 1987. He attended the Nigerian Law School and was called to Bar in 1989.  He attended several Schools including Government College, Ughelli, Delta state. He left Government College in 1984 having obtained his Higher School Certificate and was directly offered admission to read law at the Nigeria’s Premier University, The University of Ibadan in the same year. It was in the University of Ibadan that his appetite for peace made him to lead a group of nine other students to travel to the ancient city of Zaria to quell a raging religious and ethnic riot that claimed lives. As a result of the publicity he and his colleagues received on return to their campus, their enthusiasm grew and this led to the formation of a group known then as Eminent Friends’ Group – a group formed with the objectives of promoting ethnic harmony amongst Nigeria’s diverse ethnic nationalities and fighting the incidence of violence of all forms. Upon graduation from the university in 1987, he established branches of the organization in all the states of the federation. While in the Nigerian law school in 1987, he combined his studies with social activism bothering on engendering peace in Nigeria.

Indictment
In 2019, the US Department of Justice issued an indictment against Allen Onyema, on the grounds of money laundering and bank fraud. Onyema was accused of falsifying documents used for the purchase of aeroplanes for Air Peace and using those to fund purchases of luxury cars and high-end shopping. Onyema denies these allegations.

As of May 2022, the trial of a suspected co-conspirator is set to begin in August 2022.

References 

Living people
1964 births
Nigerian businesspeople
University of Ibadan alumni
Igbo people
People from Anambra State